Aidar Kumisbekov (9 February 1979) is a retired Kazakhstani professional footballer who played as a defender.

Career

International
Kumisbekov played for Kazakhstan at the 1999 FIFA World Youth Championship in Nigeria.

Career statistics

International

Statistics accurate as of match played 8 September 2007

References

External links

Living people
1979 births
Kazakhstani footballers
Association football defenders
Kazakhstan international footballers
Kazakhstan Premier League players
FC Zhenis Astana players
FC Kairat players
FC Zhetysu players
FC Irtysh Pavlodar players